The Constitution (Twenty-seventh Amendment) Act, 2017, was a proposed amendment to the Constitution of Pakistan which aimed to implement changes recommended by the Parliamentary Committee on Electoral Reforms.

It was never adopted and never became part of the constitution.

References

Amendments to the Constitution of Pakistan
2017 in Pakistani law
Acts of the Parliament of Pakistan